Saint Petersburg Stock Exchange may refer to:

 Saint Petersburg Stock Exchange
 Old Saint Petersburg Stock Exchange and Rostral Columns
 Old Saint Petersburg Stock Exchange
 Saint Petersburg Commodity and Stock Exchange